Isaac Sinclair (born c. 1980) is a perfumer from Auckland, New Zealand. He currently resides in São Paulo, Brazil, where he works as a Master Perfumer for international flavours and fragrance company Symrise. Sinclair  is one of the youngest Master Perfumers active today.

Education 

He studied at Università dell'Immagine (School of Five Senses) in Milan, Italy, majoring in Olfactive studies before apprenticing at Symrise in Paris.

Creation 

In addition to working on major accounts for Guerlain, DKNY, Natura, and Lancôme, Sinclair also works on smaller projects such as niche perfume house Abel, and candle company Ecoya.

References 

1980s births
People from Auckland
Living people
Perfumers